The House on the Volcano is a 1928 Soviet film directed by Amo Bek-Nazaryan.

Plot 
The film tells about the drill master Petros, who tells the story of the oil workers' strike to his adopted son.

Starring 
 Hrachia Nersisyan as Petros
 T. Ayvazyan as Ghukassov
 Tatyana Makhmuryan as Maro (as Tanya Makhmurova)
 V. Manukhina as Sona
 M. Garagash as Governor
 Dimitri Kipiani as Georgi
 Pavel Yesikovsky as Russian worker (as P. Yesikovsky)
 Alasgar Alakbarov

References

External links 

1928 films
1920s Russian-language films
Soviet black-and-white films
Soviet silent feature films